A registered office is the official address of an incorporated company, association or any other legal entity. Generally it will form part of the public record and is required in most countries where the registered organization or legal entity is incorporated. A registered physical office address is required for incorporated organizations to receive official correspondence and formal notices from government departments, investors, banks, shareholders and the general public.

In the United Kingdom
In the United Kingdom, the Companies Act 2006 requires all companies to have a registered office. Documents may be served on companies by delivery to the registered office address as recorded at Companies House. A registered office address is required for incorporated organizations to receive official correspondence and formal notices from government departments, investors, banks, shareholders and the general public. The registered office address does not have to be where the organization conducts its actual business or trade, and it is not unusual for law firms, accountants or incorporation agents to provide the official registered office address service. Generally, a company's registered name must be visible to the public at its registered office. Companies must include their registered office address on all communications, such as letters, and on its websites.  

A company's statutory records previously had to be kept at the registered office and available for public inspection; since 1 October 2009 it has been possible for companies to designate a single alternative inspection location (SAIL) as a place to keep their records which must be available for public inspection. Since June 2016, private companies can elect to keep certain records on the central register which is held and published by Companies House, instead of maintaining their own registers.

A company must indicate in which of the United Kingdom's three jurisdictions its registered office is to be located: England and Wales, Scotland, or Northern Ireland. Companies incorporated in Wales may elect for their registered office address to be recorded as in Wales rather than in England and Wales. Under regulations implemented in the UK on 1 October 2009, company directors may now also use a registered office address instead of their private home address for contact on the Companies House register. Although their legal registration is in either England and Wales, or in Wales, according to Companies House companies must display the company registered office location in a manner similar to one of the following suggested formats:

Other countries

In many other countries the address with which a company is registered must be where its headquarters or seat is located, and this will often determine the subnational registry at which the company must be registered.

References

External links

Companies House holds the registration details of UK companies
Incorporating a company UK Companies House guidance including explanation of registered office
Company addresses NZ Companies Office guidance on registered office address

Business
Address (geography)
United Kingdom company law